Agriotes is a genus of beetles in the family Elateridae which includes numerous species, many of which are found in the Americas, Asia and much of Europe.

Species
The Global Biodiversity Information Facility list 274 species, which include significant agricultural pests such as:

References

Taxa named by Johann Friedrich von Eschscholtz
Elaterinae